Francis Eaton may refer to:

 Francis Eaton (Mayflower passenger) (c. 1596–1633)
 Francis Eaton, 4th Baron Cheylesmore (1893–1974)